The 1998 Weymouth and Portland Borough Council election took place on 7 May 1998 to elect members of Weymouth and Portland District Council in Dorset, England. One third of the council was up for election and the council stayed under no overall control.

After the election, the composition of the council was
Labour 16
Liberal Democrat 13
Independent 4
Residents 2

Election result

References

1998
1998 English local elections
20th century in Dorset